The Republic and Canton of Neuchâtel is a French-speaking canton in western Switzerland. In 2007, its population was 169,782, of whom 39,654 (or 23.4%) were foreigners. The capital is Neuchâtel.

History

The only part of present-day Switzerland to enter the Confederation as a principality (on May 19, 1815), Neuchâtel has a unique history. Its first recorded ruler, Rudolph III of Burgundy, mentioned Neuchâtel in his will in 1032. The dynasty of Ulrich count of Fenis (Hasenburg) took over the town and its territories in 1034. The dynasty prospered and, by 1373, all the lands now part of the canton belonged to the count. In 1405, the cities of Bern and Neuchâtel entered a union. The lands of Neuchâtel had passed to the Zähringen lords of Freiburg in the late 14th century as inheritance from the childless Elisabeth, Countess of Neuchâtel, to her nephews, and then in 1458 to margraves of Sausenburg who belonged to the House of Baden.

Their heiress, Johanna of Hachberg-Sausenberg (Jehanne de Hochberg), and her husband, Louis I d'Orléans, duc de Longueville, inherited it in 1504, after which the French house of Orléans-Longueville (Valois-Dunois). Neuchâtel's Swiss allies then occupied it from 1512 to 1529 before returning it to its widowed countess.

The French preacher Guillaume Farel brought the teachings of the Protestant Reformation to the area in 1530. Therefore, when the house of Orléans-Longueville became extinct with Marie d'Orléans-Longueville's death in 1707, Neuchâtel was Protestant, and looked to avoid passing to a Catholic ruler. The rightful heiress in primogeniture from Jeanne de Rothelin was Paule de Gondi, Duchess of Retz, who was Catholic. The people of Neuchâtel chose Princess Marie's successor from among fifteen claimants. They wanted their new prince first and foremost to be a Protestant, and also to be strong enough to protect their territory but based far enough away to leave them to their own devices. King Louis XIV of France actively promoted the many French pretenders to the title, but the Neuchâtelois people in the final decision in 1708 passed them over in favour of the Protestant King Frederick I of Prussia, who claimed his entitlement in a rather complicated fashion through the House of Orange and Nassau, who were not even descended from Jeanne de Rothelin.

Frederick I and his successors ruled the Principality of Neuchâtel in personal union with Prussia from 1708 until 1806 and again from 1814 until 1857.
Napoleon Bonaparte deposed King Frederick William III of Prussia as prince of Neuchâtel and appointed instead his chief of staff Louis Alexandre Berthier. Starting in 1807, the principality provided Napoleon's Grande Armée with a battalion of rangers. The rangers were nicknamed Canaris (i.e. canaries) because of their yellow uniforms.

After the Liberation Wars the principality was restored to Frederick William III in 1814. The Conseil d'État (state council, i.e. government of Neuchâtel) addressed him in May 1814 requesting the permission to establish a special battalion, a Bataillon de Chasseurs, for the service of his majesty. Frederick William III then established by his "most-supreme cabinet order" (Allerhöchste Cabinets-Ordre, A.C.O.), issued in Paris on 19 May 1814, the Bataillon des Tirailleurs de la Garde following the same principles as with the Neuchâtel battalion within the Grande Armée. The Conseil d'Etat of Neuchâtel had the right of nomination for the battalion's officers. The commander was the battalion's only officer chosen by the monarch.

 
A year later he agreed to allow the principality to join the Swiss Confederation, then not yet an integrated federation, but a confederacy, as a full member. Thus Neuchâtel became the first and only monarchy to join the otherwise entirely republican Swiss cantons. This situation changed in 1848 when a peaceful revolution took place and established a republic, in the same year that the modern Swiss Confederation was transformed into a federation. King Frederick William IV of Prussia did not cede immediately, and several attempts at counter-revolution took place, culminating in the Neuchâtel Crisis of 1856–57. In 1857, Frederick William finally renounced the monarchy's claim on the area.

Geography

The canton of Neuchâtel is located in Romandy, the western part of Switzerland, it is also located in the Jura mountainous region. To its northeast it borders the canton of Bern, to the northwest France (Bourgogne-Franche-Comté). Lake Neuchâtel lies southeast of the canton, while the canton of Vaud is southwest of the canton of Neuchâtel. The canton lies in the central area of the Jura Mountains. Lake Neuchâtel drains the lands in the south, whilst the river Doubs drains the northern areas.

The canton is commonly divided into three regions. The viticultural region is located along the lake. Its name derives from the many vineyards found there. The region called Les Vallées lies further north. The two largest valleys of the canton of Neuchâtel lie in this region: the Ruz Valley and the Val de Travers. This region is made up of a long valley home to La Chaux-de-Fonds, Le Locle and La Brévine.

Government

Neuchâtel was one of the first cantons in Switzerland to grant women the right to vote (1959) and also to grant the vote to foreigners holding a residence permit and who have been domiciled in the canton for at least five years (2002), as well as to lower the voting age to 18.

The legislature, the Grand Council of Neuchâtel, has 115 seats distributed in proportion to the population of the six districts that make up the electoral constituencies: Neuchâtel (35 seats), Boudry (25), Val-de-Travers (8), Val-de-Ruz (10), Le Locle (10), La Chaux-de-Fonds (27). The State Council (cantonal government), five "ministers" who assume the annual presidency in turn and manage the departments of justice, health and safety; finance and social welfare; public economy; regional management; education and culture. The cantonal authorities, which have their seat in the castle (the Château de Neuchâtel), are elected every four years by universal suffrage.

The people also elect their representatives to the federal parliament every four years: five of the 200 members of the National Council (lower chamber) and two of the 46 members of the Council of States (upper chamber).

Politics

Federal election results

Political subdivisions

Districts

Until 2018 the Canton was divided into six districts. On 1 January 2018 the districts were dissolved and all municipalities were placed directly under the canton.

Boudry with capital Boudry
La Chaux-de-Fonds with capital La Chaux-de-Fonds
Le Locle with capital Le Locle
Neuchâtel with capital Neuchâtel
Val-de-Ruz with capital Cernier
Val-de-Travers with capital Val-de-Travers

Municipalities

There are 27 municipalities in the canton.

Demographics

The population is almost entirely French-speaking. The canton has historically been strongly Protestant, but in recent decades it has received an influx of Roman Catholic arrivals, notably from Portugal and Italy. In 2000, its population was closely split between Protestants (38%) and Roman Catholics (31%).

The  inhabitants are fairly evenly distributed with many small towns and villages lining the shore of the Lake of Neuchâtel. Neuchâtel is the canton's capital while La Chaux-de-Fonds is the canton's largest settlement. Some 38,000 of the inhabitants, or a little less than a quarter of the population, are of foreign origin.

Historical population 
The historical population is given in the following table:

Economy
The canton is well known for its wines, which are grown along the Lake Neuchâtel shore, and for its absinthe. The Val-de-Travers is famous as the birthplace of absinthe, which has now been re-legalized both in Switzerland and globally. There are dairy farming and cattle breeding in the valleys, but it is for the breeding of horses that Neuchâtel has a fine reputation. Watchmaking is well-established in the canton, with fine mechanics and microchip production being established more recently. Higher educational institutions include Haute école Arc (representing Bern, Jura and Neuchâtel) and the University of Neuchâtel.

Notes

References

External links

Official website
Official statistics
Neuchâtel and surroundings "Watch Valley"

Portal Neuch.ch
Village of Valangin
International Watchmaking Museum

 
Cantons of Switzerland
Arpitania
Subdivisions of Prussia
1030s establishments in the Holy Roman Empire
1034 establishments in Europe
1400s establishments in the Holy Roman Empire
1406 establishments in Europe
1648 disestablishments in the Holy Roman Empire
1707 disestablishments in the Holy Roman Empire
Counties of the Holy Roman Empire